The Berlin-Warszawa-Express (BWE) is a cross-border train service that connects Berlin and Warsaw via Frankfurt (Oder), operated jointly by Deutsche Bahn (DB Fernverkehr) and Polish State Railways (PKP Intercity). The service, classed as EuroCity, runs four times per day in each direction, with the services given the numbers 40–47. Total journey time is 5 hours, 24 minutes.

History
The Berlin-Warszawa-Express brand began in 2002, replacing the names of individual services which had been added to the EuroCity network over the previous decade. There were four pairs of services (EC 40–47) linking Berlin Zoologischer Garten and Warsaw Wschodnia, plus a fifth (48/49), which only ran from Berlin to Poznań, and as such didn't take the BWE name. This additional service was dropped in 2004, but restored in 2007, and since 2012, continues from Poznań to Gdańsk and Gdynia, under the name Berlin-Gdynia Express.

The service began to serve Berlin Hauptbahnhof after its opening in 2006, no longer serving Berlin Zoo.

Rolling stock

Each train is six coaches long, using specially branded carriages provided by both DB and PKP - the livery is white, as per DB Intercity, but with a dark blue stripe instead of the normal red. Four of them (three full 2nd class and handicap car) are provided by PKP, Restaurant/1st class and first class are delivered by DB.

Since December 2010 the train has been hauled by Siemens EuroSprinter (ES 64) locomotives, provided by PKP and known in Poland as Class EU 44 Husarz. Prior to this the DB Class 180 was the most common traction, with Class 186 and Class 232 seen on occasion. In 2016, carriages are mainly provided by PKP Intercity, only restaurant carriage is provided by Deutsche Bahn. By 2017, all German restaurant carriages were returned to Deutsche Bahn. All carriages are provided by PKP Intercity.

Potential Improvements 
Plans for the Polish Y High Speed Line include a route from Poznan to Warsaw, which follows the Berlin-Warszawa Express. Later phases include plans to extend to Berlin.

Summary of services

See also
Berlin–Wrocław railway

References

 

EuroCity
Named passenger trains of Germany
Named passenger trains of Poland
Railway services introduced in 2002